is a Japanese voice actor.

Filmography

Anime
 Hatarakiman – Editorial staff
 Zipang – Asou
 Fresh Pretty Cure – Staff
 Casshern Sins – Robot
 Saint Saiya Hades Elysiun-Hen – Nachi
 Saint Seiya Hades Underworld Edition – Nachi
 Yu-Gi-Oh! Duel Monsters – Mahad
 The Prince of Tennis – Tom Griffy
 Capeta – Wada
 AM Driver – Nilgis
 Zatch Bell! – Brago; Praying Mantis Joe
 Bobobo-bo Bo-bobo – Kuruman
 Ashita no Nadja – Bianco

Live-action dubbing
 Andromeda 3 – Chang
 Steel – Simon

Video games
 Spectacle Force Genesis – Jay Dagger
 Yamiyo ni sasayaku - tantei sagara kyōichirō  (I whisper in the dark night, detective kyoichiro sagara) – Sho Kisaragi
 Tales of Symphonia

References

External links
 
 

Living people
1977 births
Male voice actors from Tokyo
Japanese male voice actors